Gerald Baumgartner (born 14 November 1964) is an Austrian association football coach. He has been head coach of Red Bull Salzburg (A), Pasching, St. Pölten, Austria Wien, Austria Salzburg and SV Ried.

Playing career

Baumgartner played for Austria Wien from 1987 to 1989.

Coaching career

Early career

His coaching career started as an assistant coach for the reserve team for Red Bull Salzburg. He then became the head coach for the reserve team for Red Bull Salzburg from 8 April 2011 to 31 December 2011. He then went on to become head coach of Pasching from 1 January 2012 to 4 September 2013 and St. Pölten from 5 September 2014 until he became head coach of Austria Wien on 27 May 2014. Baumgartner brought St. Pölten to the Austrian Cup final during the 2013–14 season after defeating Sturm Graz 1–0 in extra time in the semi–final and qualified for the Europa League.

Austria Wien

Baumgartner became head coach of Austria Wien on 27 May 2014 and had his first training session on 10 June 2014. The style he wanted to implement was an aggressive pressing. His first competitive match in–charge at the club was a 6–0 win in the first round of the Austrian Cup against First Vienna FC. After the win in the Austrian Cup, Baumgartner failed to win any of his first seven matches in the Bundesliga. His league record at this point was five draws and two losses. His first league win came against Ried which finished 3–1. Baumgartner was sacked  on 22 March 2015 after a 1–0 loss to Ried the previous day. Andreas Ogris was appointed as head coach for the remainder of the season. Baumgartner was the fifth coach since the club sacked Karl Daxbacher in 2011 and the 31st coach since 1990.

Austria Salzburg

On 18 December 2015, Baumgartner was unveiled as the new head coach and sports director of Austria Salzburg. He finished the first season with a record of three wins, five draws, and nine losses in 17 matches.

SV Mattersburg
Baumgartner was appointed as the new manager of SV Mattersburg on 2 January 2017.

Coaching record

References

Austrian footballers
FC Red Bull Salzburg players
FK Austria Wien players
First Vienna FC players
SV Ried players
Austrian football managers
FC Juniors OÖ managers
SKN St. Pölten managers
FK Austria Wien managers
SV Austria Salzburg managers
SV Ried managers
Living people
1964 births
Association football forwards